Lighthouse Cinema may refer to:

 Lighthouse Cinema (Kolkata), Kolkata, West Bengal, India
 Light House Cinema, Dublin, Ireland
 Light House Media Centre, Wolverhampton, West Midlands, England, includes a cinema
 The Lighthouse (Poole), Poole, Dorset, England, includes a cinema
 Lighthouse Cinema, defunct New York City venue